Libya (Great Socialist People's Libyan Arab Jamahiriya) competed at the 1988 Summer Olympics in Seoul, South Korea. Six competitors, all men, took part in five events in three sports.

Competitors
The following is the list of number of competitors in the Games.

Athletics

Cycling

Two cyclists represented Libya in 1988

Men's road race
 Abdel Hamed El-Hadi — did not finish (→ no ranking)
 Abdullah Badri — did not finish (→ no ranking)

Weightlifting

References

External links
Official Olympic Reports

Nations at the 1988 Summer Olympics
1988
Olympics